Taura Stinson is an American songwriter, producer, musician, composer and author. Stinson has co-written songs for artists including Deborah Cox, Cynthia Erivo, Kelly Rowland, Destiny's Child, Kelis and Jennifer Hudson. She has also written songs for films such as Step, Mudbound and Black Nativity and for TV programs including Underground, Twin Peaks and Insecure.

Together with Laura Karpman and Raphael Saadiq she has won Critics' Choice Movie Awards and Hollywood Music in Media Awards.

Stinson has written and self-published two books, 100 Things Every Black Girl Should Know and 100 Ways to Love Yourself Inside and Out.

Life and career
Taura Stinson was born in Birmingham, Alabama and raised in Oakland, California.

In the early 1990s,  she co-founded an R&B trio called Emage with Kimbrely Evans and Mykah Montgomery. The trio signed a deal with One Love/Mercury Records and released one album, Soul Deep.

Discography
Stinson has written various songs with long time co-writer, Rapheal Saadiq, including the Grammy Award nominated songs "Good Man" (2012) by Saadiq, and "Show me the Way" (2005)) by Earth, Wind & Fire.

She has also written for artists including:

Burns 
Cynthia Erivo ("Step")
Deborah Cox 

Destiny's Child 
DRS ("Gangsta Lean") 
Jennifer Hudson
Kelis 

Kelly Rowland 
Mary J. Blige ("Mighty River")
Paloma Faith 
Usher

Filmography

Taura has written songs for various films including:
Beyond the Lights ("Airplay")
Black Nativity (soundtrack) together with Raphael Saddiq
Epic ("Gonna Be Alright") together with Raphael Saddiq
Men in Black: "Killing Time" (by Destiny's Child) with D'wayne Wiggins
Mudbound ("Mighty River"), for which she received critical acclaim earning  Academy Award, Golden Globe Award and Black Reel Award nominations for Best Original Song. 
Rio 2 ("Beautiful Creatures", "Don't Go Away", " O Vida") together with John Powell. 
The Sitter
Step ("Jump"), which won the Critics Choice Award for best song in a documentary
Don't Look Up ("Just Look Up")
Cheaper by the Dozen ("Nothing Without You")

Television
Stinson has also written songs for television, such as
Cloak & Dagger',"Come Sail Away"CSI: MiamiInsecure 
2016 Summer Olympics closing ceremony began with music from the Brazilian group Barbatuques, singing "Beautiful Creatures".Underground, various songs including “Gossypium Thorns”. Stinson was the voice of Rosalee
 You May Now Kill the Bride ("Carnivore")

Vocalist and arranger
Stinson has worked (recorded, arranged songs) for artists, including 
"Bang' Bang" by Jessie J feat Ariana Grande, and Nicki Minaj
 "Faith" by Stevie Wonder
"Expensive" by Tori Kelly
the album American Love Song by Ryan Bingham 
the album Electric Café by En Vogue

Awards and nominations

Publications100 Things Every Black Girl Should Know (2016) 100 Ways to Love Yourself Inside and Out'' (2020)

Other names
Stinson has worked under a variety of names, including Taura "Aura" Jackson, Stinson, Stinson-Jackson, T. Stinson, T. Stinson-Jackson, T. S. Jackson, Tara Stinson, Taura Latrice Stinson, Taura Stinson Jackson and Taura Stinson-Jackson.

References

External links
Taura Stinson's website
 
 
Stinson interviewed by Mingle Media TV's "Red Carpet Report" in 2017

Musicians from Birmingham, Alabama
American women songwriters
Songwriters from Alabama
Songwriters from California
Living people
Year of birth missing (living people)
Musicians from Oakland, California
21st-century American women